Klinje Lake is an artificial lake of Bosnia and Herzegovina. It is located in the municipality of Gacko.

See also
List of lakes in Bosnia and Herzegovina

References

Lakes of Bosnia and Herzegovina